William Joseph Bauer (born September 15, 1926) is a senior United States circuit judge of the United States Court of Appeals for the Seventh Circuit in Chicago and previously a United States district judge of the United States District Court for the Northern District of Illinois.

Education and career
Born in Chicago, Illinois, Bauer served in the United States Army from 1945 to 1947. He received an Artium Baccalaureus degree in 1949 from Elmhurst College and a Juris Doctor in 1952 from DePaul University College of Law. He served as an assistant state's attorney in DuPage County, Illinois from 1952 to 1956, serving as first assistant state's attorney from 1956 to 1958 and serving as state's attorney from 1959 to 1964. He was an instructor at Elmhurst College from 1952 to 1959 and was in private practice in Illinois from 1953 to 1964. He served as a Judge of the Illinois Circuit Court for the Eighteenth Judicial Circuit from 1964 to 1970. He was the United States Attorney for the Northern District of Illinois from 1970 to 1971.

Federal judicial service
Bauer was nominated by President Richard Nixon on September 14, 1971, to a seat on the United States District Court for the Northern District of Illinois vacated by Judge Joseph Sam Perry. He was confirmed by the United States Senate on November 8, 1971, and received his commission on November 10, 1971. His service terminated on January 3, 1975, due to elevation to the Seventh Circuit.

Bauer was nominated by President Gerald Ford on December 11, 1974, to a seat on the United States Court of Appeals for the Seventh Circuit vacated by Judge Otto Kerner Jr. He was confirmed by the Senate on December 19, 1974, and received his commission on December 20, 1974. He served as Chief Judge from 1986 to 1993. He assumed senior status on October 31, 1994. He was a Member of the Judicial Conference of the United States from 1987 to 1993.

On April 19, 2018, Bauer wrote the majority opinion striking down Indiana's ban on abortion due to disability as unconstitutional. Bauer was joined by Joel Flaum, over the dissent of Daniel Anthony Manion. This part was upheld in Box v. Planned Parenthood.

Honor
Bauer was inducted as a Laureate of The Lincoln Academy of Illinois and awarded the Order of Lincoln (the State’s highest honor) by the Governor of Illinois in 2010 in the area of Government & Law.

See also
 List of United States federal judges by longevity of service

References

External links
 

 DCBA Brief Online

1926 births
Living people
20th-century American judges
DePaul University College of Law alumni
Illinois state court judges
Judges of the United States Court of Appeals for the Seventh Circuit
Judges of the United States District Court for the Northern District of Illinois
Lawyers from Chicago
Military personnel from Illinois
People from Elmhurst, Illinois
United States court of appeals judges appointed by Gerald Ford
United States district court judges appointed by Richard Nixon
United States Attorneys for the Northern District of Illinois
United States Army personnel of World War II